Voldemar Hammer (also Vladimir Hammer; since 1922 Kallas-Gammer; 8 June 1894 Tallinn – 23 May 1982 Leningrad) was an Estonian politician. He was a member of Estonian Constituent Assembly. On 30 June 1919, he resigned his position and he was replaced by Jakob Mikiver.

References

1894 births
1982 deaths
Estonian Social Democratic Workers' Party politicians
Members of the Estonian Constituent Assembly
People from Kose Parish